Marfa also Timki is a single hemispherical drum or percussion instrument. It may have originated in Africa.

Timki
Timki is used by tribals of Madhya Pradesh, earlier it used to be an earthenware.

See also
 Marfa Music

References

Drums
African drums
Hand drums
Pitched percussion instruments
Yemeni musical instruments